is a Submarine simulator video game, published by Pack-In-Video, which was released exclusively in Japan in 1995.

References

External links
 Battle Submarine at superfamicom.org
 Japanese title at super-famicom.jp 

1995 video games
Office Koukan games
Pack-In-Video games
Japan-exclusive video games
Submarine simulation video games
Super Nintendo Entertainment System games
Super Nintendo Entertainment System-only games
Video games developed in Japan